W34FK-D (channel 33) is a television station serving western Puerto Rico that is licensed to Añasco. The station is owned by TeleNorte Broadcasting Corp. The station's transmitter is located at Cerro Canta Gallo in Aguada.

External links

34FK-D
Low-power television stations in the United States